These are the Kowloon East results of the 2008 Hong Kong legislative election. The election was held on 7 September 2008 and all 4 seats in Kowloon East where consisted of Wong Tai Sin District and Kwun Tong District were contested, after one seat was abolished. The Democratic Party's Fred Li, Democratic Alliance for the Betterment and Progress of Hong Kong's Chan Kam-lam  and Civic Party's Alan Leong each secured their party's incumbent seat, and Federation of Trade Unions's Wong Kwok-kin replaced retiring Chan Yuen-han.

Overall results
Before election:

Change in composition:

Candidates list

See also
Legislative Council of Hong Kong
Hong Kong legislative elections
2008 Hong Kong legislative election

References

2008 Hong Kong legislative election